Tom Finkelpearl (born February 1, 1956) is an American arts promoter, former museum director, and former Commissioner of the New York City Department of Cultural Affairs. He was appointed in 2014 by the New York City mayor, Bill de Blasio, and served through the end of 2019.

Early life and career
He graduated from Phillips Academy in Andover, Massachusetts in 1974, from Princeton University in 1979 and from Hunter College (MFA) in 1983.

Before joining city government, Finkelpearl served for 12 years as director of the Queens Museum from 2002 to 2014. While serving as director, he hired community organizers to emphasize the diversity of the immigrant population. He presided over the museum's $68 million renovation effort. He doubled the size of the Queens Museum and saw its budget grow from $2.3 million to $4.9 million. He served under mayor David Dinkins and Rudy Giuliani by running the city's Percent for Art program.

City government
As commissioner, he oversaw city funding of nonprofit arts organizations, and is leading an effort to promote cultural diversity in arts programs citywide. His department is in charge of a $156 million budget. His approach to arts has been described as populist and he sees art and artists as making a valuable contribution to the overall economic health of the city.

In July 2017, Mayor de Blasio and Commissioner Finkelpearl announced the launch of CreateNYC, a 10-year cultural plan to increase access to arts and culture programming in all five boroughs and help make New York's cultural institutions more reflective of the city’s multiethnic, multicultural population, having previously stated that "every corner of this city needs to have art." He introduced a program to offer free access to member institutions using a municipal identification card.

Finkelpearl was criticized for his disagreements with public opinion of two future public monuments in Central Park: a women's suffrage monument that will be the park's first depicting real women, as well as a statue to replace J. Marion Sims, one of the first gynecologists who also performed experimental surgeries on enslaved women.

On October 31, 2019, Finkelpearl announced his resignation as Commissioner, effective at the end of 2019.

References

External links
 About the commissioner NYC site

Hunter College alumni
Princeton University alumni
Phillips Academy alumni
Politicians from New York City
Directors of museums in the United States
Living people
1956 births
Artists from New York City